HMS Hope was a 70-gun third rate ship of the line of the English Royal Navy, built by William Castle launched at Deptford Dockyard in 1678.

She fought in the Battle of Beachy Head (1690) and the Battle of Barfleur.

Hope was captured in 1695.

Notes

References

Lavery, Brian (2003) The Ship of the Line - Volume 1: The development of the battlefleet 1650-1850. Conway Maritime Press. .

Ships of the line of the Royal Navy
1670s ships
Captured ships